The Utah Utes football program is a college football team that represents the University of Utah. The Utes have completed 124 seasons and played in 21 certified bowl games. In 1910, Utah joined the Rocky Mountain Athletic Conference (RMAC), the program's first conference affiliation. The Utes won eight conference championships, including six consecutive titles from 1928 to 1933. In 1938 the Utah, along with six other RMAC schools left the conference to form the Mountain States Conference, more commonly known as the Big Seven. After the Colorado Buffaloes withdrew from the Big Seven, the conference was known as the Skyline Conference. The Utes won ten conference championships while in the conference. In 1962, Utah became a charter member of the Western Athletic Conference (WAC). When the charter members of the WAC left at the end of the 1998 season, Utah became a charter member of the Mountain West Conference (MWC) winning four conference titles. In 2010, the Utes withdrew from the MWC and along with former conference rival Colorado, became the 11th and 12th members of the Pac-12 Conference (Pac-12) in the newly formed South Division.

Seasons

Notes

References

Utah Utes
Utah Utes football seasons